Mitú is the capital city of the Vaupés Department, Colombia.

Mitu may also refer to:
Mitu (bird), a genus of curassows, native to South America
Mitu (surname), a Romanian surname
Mitu, Iran, a village in Tamugheh Rural District, Saqqez County, Kurdistan Province, Iran
Mitú (entertainment) Latino digital media company and digital content publisher
The Truth (2008 TV series), a Singaporean TV series

See also 
 Mithu (disambiguation)
 Mittu (disambiguation)
 Mitsu (disambiguation)